Abu Muhammad Abdullah ibn Abd al-Wahid, or Abdullah, was the second ruler of the Hafsid dynasty in Ifriqiya from 1224 to 1229.

Life 
Abdullah was the son of the founder of the Hafsid dynasty, Abu Muhammad Abd al-Wahid ibn Abi Hafs, whom the Almohads made the ruler of Ifriqiya to better control the nomads of the Banu Hilal tribe.

After the death of his father, Abdullah succeeded in strengthening his power and proclaimed independence from the Caliph Almohad. However, in 1228, his brother Abu Zakaria Yahya I rebelled against him. Abdullah marched from Tunis to Qayrawan to confront his brother in battle, but his troops deserted him and Abu Zakariya overthrew him, forcing him to be content with the title of Sheikh and to devote himself to religious life.

Literature 
 Yver G. Ḥafṣids // Encyclopaedia of Islam, primera edición (1913-1936). Editada por M. Th. Houtsma, TW Arnold, R. Basset, R. Hartmann. Brill Online, 2016. Referencia. 20 de febrero de 2017

References

1229 deaths
Year of birth unknown
13th-century Hafsid caliphs